The  Miss Kansas Teen USA competition is the pageant that selects the representative for the state of Kansas in the Miss Teen USA pageant. This pageant has been part of the Vanbros organisation since 1992, and in 2006, they celebrated their fifteen-year anniversary with a reunion of former titleholders at the 2007 pageant. For the first time, all the judges for both the Miss Kansas USA and Miss Kansas Teen USA pageants were former titleholders from the Vanbros states: Kansas, Missouri, Oklahoma and Nebraska.

Prior to 1994, the pageant was held concurrently with the Miss Kansas USA event, which was hosted by Kansas City. In 1994, the pageant was moved to Wichita. In 2000, the pageant directors moved the event to the small town of Maize, just outside Wichita, where it was also held the following year, before it was brought back to Wichita proper from 2002–2003. The pageant was held in Overland Park for the first time in 2004 and also in 2005. In 2006, it moved to Lawrence.

Kansas had a slow start at Miss Teen USA, and did not place until 1991. Despite this, they placed extremely well in the 1990s, with one semi-finalist placing, one finalist placing, two 2nd runner-up placings and one winner, and were in fact the second highest placed state in that decade. Latasha Laine Lawrie brought Kansas back into the placings in the 21st century with her finalist placing in 2005. She also won the Miss Photogenic award, the only major award won by a Kansas teen.
 
Seven Kansas teens have gone on to win the Miss Kansas USA crown. The most successful, and most notable of these was Danielle Boatwright, who placed 2nd runner-up to Miss Teen USA, 1st runner-up to Miss USA and won the reality TV show Survivor: Guatemala.

In 1995, Keylee Sue Sanders won the national crown in Wichita, Kansas making Kansas the only state to win the Miss USA and Miss Teen USA titles in their home state.

Gracie Hendrickson of Newton was crowned Miss Kansas Teen USA 2022 on May 8, 2022 at B&B Live and Music Theater in Shawnee. She will represent Kansas for the title of Miss Teen USA 2022.

Results summary

Placements
Miss Teen USA: Keylee Sue Sanders (1995), Hailey Colborn (2018)
2nd runners-up: Danielle Boatwright (1992), Melissa Hurtig (1994)
3rd runners-up: Taylor Clark (2011)
Top 6: Mariah Bergmann (1997)
Top 10: Latasha Lawrie (2005), Gentry Miller (2006), Jaymie Stokes (2007)
Top 12: Denise Blatchford (1991)
Top 15/16: Katie Taylor (2012), Alyssa Klinzing (2013), Hannah DeBok (2019), Gracie Hendrickson (2022)
Kansas holds a record of 14 placements at Miss Teen USA.

Awards
Miss Photogenic: LaTasha Lawrie (2005)
Style Award: Mandy Carraway (1996)

Winners 

1 Age at the time of the Miss Teen USA pageant

References

External links
Official website

Kansas
Women in Kansas